Prince Lorenz of Belgium, Archduke of Austria-Este (born 16 December 1955) is a member of the Belgian royal family as the husband of Princess Astrid of Belgium. He is the head of the House of Austria-Este, a cadet branch of the House of Habsburg-Lorraine; he has held this position since 1996.

Early life
Prince Lorenz was born at Belvedere Clinic in Boulogne-Billancourt, Hauts-de-Seine, France as the second child and eldest son of Robert, Archduke of Austria-Este, and his wife, Archduchess Margaret (née Princess Margherita of Savoy-Aosta). He is the grandson of Charles I of Austria, the last Emperor of Austria.

He and his uncle, Carl Ludwig, complained about the constitutional provision that prohibited members of the former ruling dynasty from running in the Austrian presidential elections, and the terms under which their family was banished from the country. Their subsequent appeal to the European Commission for Human Rights was ruled inadmissible by the court. Further, in June 2011, the Habsburg Law was repealed by the Austrian Parliament.

Marriage
On 22 September 1984, at Church of Our Blessed Lady of the Sablon in Brussels, Prince Lorenz married Princess Astrid of Belgium, the only daughter of the then-Prince and Princess of Liège, later King Albert II and Queen Paola. The couple has five children: Prince Amedeo, Princess Maria Laura, Prince Joachim, Princess Luisa Maria, and Princess Laetitia Maria. Prince Lorenz is the godfather to Prince Carl-Johan of Nassau, youngest child of Prince Jean of Luxembourg, and Count Costantino Secco di Aragona, the oldest son of his cousin, Archduchess Catharina-Maria of Austria.

Patronages
Since 2004, Lorenz has served as the honorary president of the Council of the Koninklijke Vereniging der Historische Woonsteden van België/Association Royale des Demeures Historiques de Belgique. Since 2005, he has also served as the Patron of Europae Thesauri, an association of European cathedral and church treasuries.

Lorenz also served as deputy chairman of the Société des Amis of the Almanach de Gotha. In 2015, he was named a member of the Royal Crown Council of Romania.

Title
The title Prince of Belgium was granted to him by royal decree on 10 November 1995 by his father-in-law, King Albert II of Belgium. The Belgian monarchy refers to him as the Archduke of Austria-Este.

Honours

National
 House of Habsburg: 1,285th Knight of the Distinguished Order of the Golden Fleece
: Grand Cordon of the Order of Leopold

Foreign

 : Grand Cross of the Order of Merit of the Federal Republic of Germany
 : Grand Cross of the Order of Adolphe of Nassau
 : Grand Cross of the Order of the Crown
  Montenegrin Royal Family: Knight Grand Cross of the Order of Prince Danilo I
 : Grand Cross of the Royal Norwegian Order of Merit
 : Grand Cross of the Order of Prince Henry
  Romanian Royal Family: Knight Grand Cross of the Royal Order of the Crown
 : Knight Grand Cross of the Order of Civil Merit
 : Commander Grand Cross of the Royal Order of the Polar Star

Military ranks
  1980– : Austrian Armed Forces, Leutnant as Reserve Officer

References

External links
 Official Belgian Monarchy Website – Prince Lorenz

1955 births
Living people
Austria-Este
Austrian princes
Dukes of Modena
Belgian people of Austrian descent
Belgian people of Hungarian descent

Knights of the Golden Fleece of Austria
Grand Crosses with Star and Sash of the Order of Merit of the Federal Republic of Germany
Grand Crosses of the Order of the Crown (Netherlands)
Grand Crosses of the Order of the Crown (Romania)
Grand Cross of the Order of Civil Merit
Commanders Grand Cross of the Order of the Polar Star
University of St. Gallen alumni
Austrian people of Belgian descent